Raimundos is a Brazilian punk/hardcore band formed in 1987 by Digão and Rodolfo Abrantes, in Brasília, Distrito Federal. They had major influences from 1980s punk bands, especially Ramones, which their name is a play on. Raimundos went on to achieve major success and become one of the most influential rock bands of Brazil in the 1990s, with multiple gold records and a double platinum achievement on their MTV live album. The band's prominence decreased significantly with the exit of vocalist Abrantes to focus on religious activities.

The name of the band alludes and ironically refers to the proper name Raimundo, as it was one of the most common male first names of persons from the Northeast region of Brazil, while also being a local-flavored homage to the Ramones.

Singer João Gordo of Ratos de Porão participated on their first album Raimundos (1994) providing backing vocals on the song "MM's", while vocalist Derrick Green of Sepultura participated on their album Kavookavala.

Members

Current members 
 Digão: lead vocals (2001–present), lead guitar (1992 - present), backing vocals (1992 - 2001), drums (1987 - 1990)
 Marquim: rhythm guitar, lead guitar, backing vocals (2001–present)
 Caio: drums (2007–present)

Past members 
 Rodolfo Abrantes: lead vocals, rhythm guitar, percussion (1987 - 2001)
 Fred: drums (1992 - 2007)
 Canisso: bass guitar, backing vocals (1987 - 2002, 2007–2023)
 Alf: bass guitar (2002 - 2007)

Discography

Demos 
 (1993) Raimundos

Studio albums 
 (1994) Raimundos
 (1995) Lavô Tá Novo
 (1996) Cesta Básica
 (1997) Lapadas do Povo
 (1999) Só no Forévis
 (2001) Éramos Quatro
 (2002) Kavookavala
 (2014) Cantigas de Roda

Live albums 
 (2000) MTV ao Vivo: Raimundos
 (2011) Roda Viva
 (2014) Cantigas de Garagem
 (2017) Raimundos Acústico

Extended plays 
 (2005) Pt qQ cOisAh

Compilation albums 
 (2005) Mais MTV Raimundos

References

External Links
 
 

Brazilian punk rock groups
Brazilian hardcore punk groups
Alternative metal musical groups
Musical groups established in 1987
Warner Music Group artists
Musicians from Brasília
1987 establishments in Brazil